Iryanthera is a flowering plant genus in the family Myristicaceae.

Species include:
Iryanthera campinae W.A.Rodrigues
Iryanthera coriacea Ducke
Iryanthera crassifolia A.C. Sm.
Iryanthera dialyandra Ducke
Iryanthera elliptica Ducke – sangretoro
Iryanthera grandis Ducke
Iryanthera hostmannii (Benth.) Warb.
Iryanthera inpae W.A. Rodrigues
Iryanthera juruensis Warb.
Iryanthera laevis Markgr.
Iryanthera lancifolia Ducke – arbol camarón, cabo de hacha
Iryanthera macrophylla Warb.
Iryanthera megistocarpa A.H. Gentry
Iryanthera obovata Ducke
Iryanthera paradoxa (Schwacke) Warb.
Iryanthera paraensis Huber
Iryanthera polyneura Ducke
Iryanthera sagotiana (Benth.) Warb.
Iryanthera tessmannii Markgr.
Iryanthera tricornis Ducke

References

Myristicaceae
Myristicaceae genera
Taxonomy articles created by Polbot